Hutsul Secession (also called Carpathian style or East Galician style) is an architectural style which developed in Eastern Galicia, particularly in Lviv. The style embodies the first attempt to create a national Ukrainian style in the late 19th and early 20th centuries. The style is based on local folk architecture, but incorporates elements of other regional Secession styles. Specifically, the Vienna Secession coupled with the folk architecture of the Hutsul highlanders formed the basis of the Hutsul Secession. The most prominent Hustul Secessioinist was Ivan Levynskyi, who headed a firm of several other architects, including Tadeusz Obmiński, Oleksandr Lushpynskyi, and Lev Levynskyi.

Description 
The Hutsul Secession style includes large, sloping roofs with elaborate contours. The buildings are often topped with towers akin to the bell towers of Hutsul churches. Also drawn from the Hutsul folk architecture is the range of color and décor from the utilization of metals and ceramics in the decorative aspects of buildings. The forms of the windows, awnings, and doorways are distinctly elastic, embodying the expressive forms of the movement.

Examples

First Municipal Polyclinic 

The First Municipal Polyclinic is a four-story building which was constructed in 1906. The building was designed by Ivan Levynskyi and Tadeusz Obmiński and is today designated as an Architectural Monument. Formerly the Dnister Insurance Company Building, it played an important role in the cultural community of Ukraine in the years after its completion. In the 1950s, the building was redesigned, losing almost all its original interior. It was host to a Communist Party regional committee as well as several other community amenities and shops during the Cold War era, and today it is home to the clinic, a gymnasium,a pharmacy, and a binding shop.

Bursa of the Deacons of St. Yura Cathedral 
The Bursa of the Deacons of St. Yura Cathedral finished construction in 1904 and was designed by Tadeusz Obmiński. Decorations on the façade, especially under the windows and roof, were inspired by Ukrainian embroidery. The colors of the decorative tiles on the building are brown, yellow, green, and white, also reminiscent of the traditional colors of Hutsul folk art.

Solecki Clinic 

The Solecki Clinic was completed in 1908 and was designed by Oleksandr Lushpynskyi. The building was owned by Kazimierez Solecki, for whom it was named, until WWI, and it was built to be a sanatorium for the Red Cross. While the building was constructed in the Art Nouveau style, it incorporated motifs of the Hutsul Secession.

Dormitory of the Academic House 
The Dormitory of the Academic House was completed in 1906 and was a joint project between several architects of Levynskyi's firm. This building ties together the ornamentation of the Hutsul style with the underlying elements of the Zakopane style. The building serves as an academic center for local students in Lviv.

Bursa of the National House Institute 
The Bursa of the National House Institute, completed in 1907, was another joint project undertaken by Levynskyi's firm. Serving as a dormitory for boys of the National House Institute, the building was capable of housing upwards of 200 students.

References 

Lviv
Architecture in Ukraine
Art Nouveau